Dane Cook: ISolated INcident is a stand-up comedy special. ISolated INcident premiered on Comedy Central on May 17, 2009, with the CD/DVD release following on May 19. In the special, Cook performs for a crowd of 400 people at the Laugh Factory.  The entire special was shot in one take with no edits. He then started performing the new material live for the Isolated Incident – Globo Thermo Tour 2009, which began on April 25, 2009. Dane Cook released the DVD special that was aired on Comedy Central on November 17, 2009.

Track listing
Intro – 0:25
Obama – 3:45
Self Assassination – 1:52
Vernacular – 2:45
Pissed Off – 1:49
Twat Swatters – 2:21
Banter #1 – 0:35
Mom & Pops – 3:10
Haters – 4:30
Adoption – 1:24
Syncing Feelings – 1:01
W.W.Y.D.I.?? – 4:21 (What Would You Do, If??)
Interracial Tail – 2:01
Remote Location – 4:48
Push and Pray – 0:58
Big Shot – 2:40
Rigamarole – 2:26
Role Play – 4:56
Hidden Gems – 1:08
Peanut Butter Smack – 7:04
War Gamer – 1:47
Banter #2 – 0:33
The 'C' Word – 2:19
Novel Ideas – 1:23
Spiritual Comeback – 1:23
Alternate Ending to Track 13 – 0:26
Banter #3 – 2:53

 *Tracks 21–27 not on TV Special

References

Dane Cook albums
2009 live albums
Comedy Central Records live albums
Stand-up comedy albums
Spoken word albums by American artists
2000s comedy albums